Magne Nylenna (born 12 October 1952) is a Norwegian physician, organizational leader, journal editor and professor. He is professor of social medicine at the University of Oslo and Norwegian University of Science and Technology.

Career
Nylenna was born in Ålesund, and graduated as dr.med. from the University of Oslo in 1988. He edited the Journal of the Norwegian Medical Association from 1987 to 2001, was secretary general for the Norwegian Medical Association from 2002 to 2003, and was principal editor of the encyclopedia . He is appointed professor of social medicine at the University of Oslo and Norwegian University of Science and Technology.

References

1952 births
Living people
People from Ålesund
University of Oslo alumni
Academic staff of the University of Oslo
Academic staff of the Norwegian University of Science and Technology
20th-century Norwegian physicians
21st-century Norwegian physicians
Norwegian public health doctors
Norwegian editors